Jan Anthonie Bruijn (born 7 February 1958) is a Dutch politician and physician serving as President of the Senate since 2 July 2019. A member of the People's Party for Freedom and Democracy (VVD), he has been a member of the Senate since 6 November 2012. He's also a professor of medicine at Leiden University.

References 

1958 births
Living people
Dutch expatriates in the United States
Dutch immunologists
Dutch medical researchers
Dutch nephrologists
Dutch nonprofit directors
Dutch nonprofit executives
Dutch pathologists
Erasmus University Rotterdam alumni
Harvard Medical School faculty
Leiden University alumni
Academic staff of Leiden University
Johns Hopkins School of Medicine alumni
Members of the Royal Netherlands Academy of Arts and Sciences
Members of the Senate (Netherlands)
Municipal councillors of Wassenaar
Physicians from The Hague
People from Wassenaar
People's Party for Freedom and Democracy politicians
Presidents of the Senate (Netherlands)
20th-century Dutch educators
20th-century Dutch physicians
21st-century Dutch educators
21st-century Dutch politicians
21st-century Dutch physicians